Mason Colin Hancock (born 10 February 2003) is an English professional footballer who plays as a defender for Aberdeen.

Career

Aberdeen
Originally starting his career with Fulham, where he spent eight years, Hancock went onto have spells with Oxford United and Woking, before making the move to Scotland to join Aberdeen in the Summer of 2020. Following his arrival, he quickly progressed through the youth ranks and within the space of a year he was in and around the first-team squad, featuring as an unused substitute in their Scottish Premiership fixture with Heart of Midlothian.

Six months later, Hancock signed a new one-year contract extension, tying him to the club until May 2023. Following this, he was then subsequently sent out on loan to Scottish League Two side, Stirling Albion for the remainder of the 2021–22 campaign. He went onto feature fourteen times in all competitions before returning to Pittodrie in May later that year.

Ahead of the 2022–23 campaign, Hancock was assigned the number 26 jersey. On 10 July 2022, he made his first-team debut for the club, starting in a 2–0 victory over Peterhead in the Scottish League Cup. However, was substituted after 35 minutes after sustaining an injury. On 28 July 2022, after featuring four times for Aberdeen in the Scottish League Cup, he was sent out on loan to Arbroath for the remainder of the campaign. After making 13 appearances for Arbroath, Hancock returned to Aberdeen after sustaining a serious knee injury.

Career statistics

References

External links

2003 births
Living people
English footballers
Association football defenders
Fulham F.C. players
Oxford United F.C. players
Woking F.C. players
Aberdeen F.C. players
Stirling Albion F.C. players
Arbroath F.C. players
Scottish Professional Football League players